Valance may refer to:

People
 Valance Nambishi (born 1997), Zambian footballer
 Valance Connell (born 1944), Barbadian cricketer
 Glen Sabre Valance (1943–1964), Australian murderer
 Holly Valance (born 1983), Australian actress and singer
 Olympia Valance (born 1993), Australian actress and model
 Peter Valance (born 1980), German illusionist
 Ricky Valance (1936–2020), Welsh singer

Other uses
 Window valance, used above a window to conceal hardware or other window treatments
 Bed skirt, a piece of decorative fabric between the mattress and the box spring of a bed
 Smoke deflectors on a steam locomotive

See also
 Valence (disambiguation)
 Vallance, a surname